Mõrtsuka is a lake of Estonia.

See also
List of lakes of Estonia

Mortsuka
Otepää Parish
Mortsuka